The City Below is a 2010 German film directed by Christoph Hochhäusler. It was screened in the Un Certain Regard section at the 2010 Cannes Film Festival.

Cast
 Robert Hunger-Bühler as Roland Cordes
 Nicolette Krebitz as Svenja Steve
 Mark Waschke as Oliver Steve
 Wolfgang Böck as Werner Löbau
 Corinna Kirchhoff as Claudia Cordes
 Michael Abendroth as Hartmut John
 Angelika Bartsch as Annika Lebert
 André Dietz as Mario Scharf
 Oliver Broumis as Maas
 Paul Faßnacht as Hermann Josef Esch
 Alexandra Finder as Britta Lau
 Piet Fuchs as Jens Janssen
 Stefan Gebelhoff as Headhunter
 Johannes Kiebranz as Gordon Parker
 Antje Lewald as Ulrke Krantz
 Viola Pobitschka as Constanze Lehmann

References

External links

2010 films
2010s business films
German drama films
2010s German-language films
Films directed by Christoph Hochhäusler
Films set in Frankfurt
Adultery in films
2010s German films